Harold Anthony Knapp was an American mathematician. He earned a doctorate in mathematics with a minor in physics at the Massachusetts Institute of Technology in 1947. He first worked as an operations analyst within the Office of the Chief of Naval Operations. He then worked for the Institute for Defense Analyses "which did highly sensitive studies on nuclear warfare for the Joint Chiefs of Staff, the Office of the Secretary of Defense, and the Defense Nuclear Agency". In 1981, "he joined the Joint Program Office in the Department of Defense, whose innocuous title hid the awesome responsibility of designing and putting into effect a system that would assure the continuity of government during nuclear war."

Awards

 Oliver Wendell Holmes Award from the American Civil Liberties Union
 Secretary of Defense Meritorious Civilian Service Award (March 1989)

Bibliography

The Iodine-131 contamination of Utahans from radioactive fallout
 "The Contribution of Short Lived Isotopes and Hot Spots to Radiation Exposure in the United States from Nuclear Test Fallout", NTA, NV00019168, June 6, 1960
 "Iodine-131 in Fresh Milk and Human Thyroids Following a Single Deposition of Nuclear Test Fallout", TLD-19266, Health and Safety, TID-4500, 24th ed. (Washington, D.C., 1 June 1963)
 "Iodine-131 in Fresh Milk and Human Thyroids following a Single Deposition of Nuclear Test Fall-Out", Nature, 9 May 1964, 534-7
 "Computation of the Radiation Dose Which Might Have Accrued Had the Nuclear Cloud from the 42.7 KT Simon Shot of April 25, 1953, Experienced a Rainout at a Distance of 120 Miles from the Nevada Test Site Similar to the Rainout Which Occurred 36 Hours After Detonation in the Vicinity of Troy, New York", October 6, 1982. Material submitted in evidence at the Allen trial.

The Giles-Johnson rape case
 "A Report to the Governor of Maryland: Request for Full Pardon for Three Citizens of Montgomery County Awaiting Execution in the Maryland Penitentiary", July 6, 1963
 Harold Knapp, editorial for Gaithersburg Gazette, June 4, 1964, Giles-Johnson Defense Committee, Series VI, Box 13, from the Maryland Room University of Maryland Archives.

See also
Edward B. Lewis
Linus Pauling
Ernest Sternglass
John Gofman

References

External links
 Glenn Fowler, Harold A. Knapp, Nuclear Test Expert, Dies at 65, The New York Times, November 11, 1989
 Ben A. Franklin, Two Negroes win retrial in rape, The New York Times, November 11, 1964
 Hannah Riley, Remembering the Giles-Johnson Case, Criminal Injustice, September 13, 2013
 Harold A. and Barbara B. Knapp papers at the University of Maryland Libraries 

1989 deaths
Year of birth missing
Massachusetts Institute of Technology School of Science alumni
Mathematicians from Maryland